Université d'État d'Haïti, Campus Roi Henri Christophe is a university campus located in Limonade, northern Haiti. The campus is part of the University of Haiti and was completed in 2012. Donated by the Government of the Dominican Republic, during the presidency of Leonel Fernandez Reyna, the campus was built at a cost of US$ 50 million.

The campus can hold up to 10,000 students, but fewer currently attend.

External links
University of Haiti (Université d'État d'Haïti) official site

References

Universities in Haiti
National universities
Educational institutions established in 2012
2012 establishments in Haiti
Buildings and structures in Cap-Haïtien
State University of Haiti